Marilyn Mehlmann (born in London, 1939) is a Swedish environmentalist and educator.

Early life and education
Born in England, Mehlmann went to a French school and worked in Norway and Denmark before settling in Sweden.

Career
At the start of her career, Mehlmann was involved with product development at IBM. After a period as Senior Associate at the consultancy firm Projektstyrning AB she founded her own management consultancy, while also acting as director of the Swedish Institute for Social Inventions.

In 1995, Mehlmann was appointed General Secretary of Global Action Plan International, a network of NGOs that specialises in sustainable behaviour change. She has worked for several decades in around 30 countries in Europe, the United States, Asia, and Southern Africa to empower individuals and organizations to live and work more sustainably. Mehlmann helps to co-create new methods and tools for sustainable development, including a Learning for Change methodology currently offered on three continents. Since 2005, Mehlmann is also a Vice-President of the Union of International Associations or UIA. Mehlmann is a member of several advisory boards.

In November 2010, Mehlmann gave a TEDx talk on sustainable change in her hometown of Stockholm.

In 2011, Mehlmann was awarded the Rachel Carson Prize for her long-term efforts to involve individuals, companies and NGOs in acting sustainably.

Mehlmann is also the author and co-author of numerous publications.

In 2017 Marilyn together with her husband Alexander founded the not-for-profit organization Legacy17. Legacy17 is an international cooperative of leading-edge consultants, practitioners and educators focused on supporting the realization of the UN’s 17 Sustainable Development Goals.

Selected publications

In English
 A Transformative Edge: Knowledge, Inspiration and Experiences for Educatorsof Adults, with Ursel Biester, published in 2020.
 Conscious Lifestyle and the UN SDGs: forthcoming in the proceedings of the Gross National Happiness Conference, Bhutan, 2015.
 Learning for Change, with André Benaim: an iBook published in 2013.
 ESD Dialogues: A pedagogy for Sustainable Development, with Olena Pometun, published in Russian in 2012, in English in 2013.
 Drawing for Life: Comics as a Method for Education for Sustainable Development, with four co-authors, published in 5 languages, 2012.
 Learning to Live Sustainably (with Nadia McLaren and Olena Pometun) in Global Environmental Research, Yokohama, 2010.

In Swedish
 Empowerment, a Handbook for the Swedish Trade Union Organization TCO, Bilda förlag, 2002.
 EkoTeam, a Workbook for Individuals and Households Wishing to Live More Sustainably, Bilda Förlag, 1996.

References 

1939 births
Living people
People from London
Swedish environmentalists
Swedish women environmentalists
IBM Women